The 2012 Bethune–Cookman Wildcats baseball team represents Bethune-Cookman University in the sport of baseball during the 2012 college baseball season.  The Wildcats competed in Division I of the National Collegiate Athletic Association (NCAA) and the Southern Division of the Mid-Eastern Athletic Conference (MEAC). The team is coached by Jason Beverlin, who entered his first season at Bethune-Cookman. The Wildcats won the MEAC Tournament and moved on to the NCAA Tournament and participated in the Gainesville Regional, where they were beat 0-2.

Roster

Schedule

! style="background:#E4A41D;color:black;"| Regular Season
|- valign="top" 

|- bgcolor="#ddffdd"
| May 17 || vs. (4N)  || (1) || Marty L. Miller Field || 10-4 || Garner (4-4)|| Neddo (0-12) || Simpson (1) ||   || 31-24 ||
|- bgcolor="#ddffdd"
| May 18 || vs. (2N)  || (1) || Marty L. Miller Field || 9-0 || Durapau (4-6) || Vanassche (4-7) ||  ||  || 32-24 ||
|- align="center" bgcolor= "#ddffdd"
| May 19 || vs. (3N)  || (1) || Marty L. Miller Field || 3-0 || Gonzalez (9-1) || Gonzalez (1-6) || Dailey (11) ||  || 33-24 || 
|- align="center" bgcolor= "ffddd"
| May 20 || vs. (1N) Delaware State || (1) || Marty L. Miller Field || 2-3 || Dill (3-1) || Hernandez (6-3) || Elliott (1) ||  || 33-25 ||
|- align="center" bgcolor= "#ddffdd"
| May 20 || vs. (1N) Delaware State || (1) || Marty L. Miller Field || 8-3 || Rivera (3-3) || McClain (9-4) || || || 34-25 || 
|-

|- align="center" bgcolor="ffddd"
| June 1 || (1) Florida || (4) || Gainesville, Florida || 0-4 || Crawford (6-2) || Gonzalez (9-2) || || 3285 || 34-26 || 0-1
|- align="center" bgcolor="ffddd"
| June 2 ||  || (4) || Gainesville, Fla. || 2-8 || Pegler (10-2) || Durapau (4-7) || || 1441 || 34-27 || 0-2
|-

References

Bethune-Cookman
Bethune–Cookman Wildcats baseball seasons
Bethune-Cookman Wildcats baseball
Bethune-Cookman